Inge van der Heijden (born 12 August 1999) is a Dutch professional racing cyclist, who currently rides for UCI Women's Continental Team  in road cycling, and in cyclo-cross for UCI Cyclo-cross Team .

Major results

2015–2016
 1st Leudelange
 3rd National Under-23 Championships
2016–2017
 2nd National Under-23 Championships
2017–2018
 1st  National Under-23 Championships
 Toi Toi Cup
2nd Slany
2018–2019
 1st  UCI World Under-23 Championships
 1st Rucphen
 2nd  UEC European Under-23 Championships
 3rd National Under-23 Championships
 Ethias Cross
3rd Hulst
 3rd Mol
2019–2020
 1st  National Under-23 Championships
 Ethias Cross
2nd Eeklo
2nd Maldegem
3rd Meulebeke
 3rd Oostmalle
 3rd Mol
 3rd Woerden
2020–2021
 2nd Gullegem
 Ethias Cross
3rd Essen
 3rd Oostmalle
2021–2022
 Superprestige
2nd Boom
3rd Ruddervoorde
2022–2023
 1st Mechelen
 1st Fayetteville
 2nd Overall Superprestige
2nd Ruddervoorde
2nd Heusden-Zolder
2nd Gullegem
3rd Niel
3rd Merksplas
 UCI World Cup
3rd Besançon

References

External links
 

1999 births
Living people
Dutch female cyclists
Place of birth missing (living people)
Cyclo-cross cyclists
People from Maashorst
Cyclists from North Brabant
21st-century Dutch women